Walter Symes (1852 – 14 October 1914) was a Liberal Party Member of Parliament in New Zealand.

Biography

Early life
Walter Symes was born in Taranaki in 1852. He came from a rural background, with his parents (who were English immigrants) farming land at Mangorei at the outbreak of the New Zealand Wars. He lived in New Plymouth for some many years and it was there where he received his education in a school on the present site of Wesley Hall. He later moved to Wanganui.

Political career

He was elected as the Member of Parliament for the Egmont electorate from 1896 to 1902 representing the Liberal Party. He then held the Patea electorate from 1902 to 1908, when he was defeated standing for Stratford.

Death
Symes died in Hamilton on 14 October 1914, aged 63, and was buried at Hamilton West Cemetery. He was survived by his wife and children.

References

|-

1852 births
1914 deaths
New Zealand Liberal Party MPs
Members of the New Zealand House of Representatives
New Zealand MPs for North Island electorates
Unsuccessful candidates in the 1908 New Zealand general election
People from Taranaki
Burials at Hamilton West Cemetery
New Zealand people of English descent
19th-century New Zealand politicians